Risanamento (literally, making healthy again) is a name given to the large scale re-planning of Italian cities following unification.  Particular examples are the Risanamento of Florence and Naples.

Italian unification
19th century in the Grand Duchy of Tuscany
19th century in Naples
History of Florence